The Gundara Formation is a geologic formation in Armenia. It preserves fossils dating back to the Permian period.

See also

 List of fossiliferous stratigraphic units in Armenia

References
 

Permian Armenia
Permian northern paleotemperate deposits